Muse is a term from a person who awakens creative inspiration in a person of the arts (such as a writer, artist, composer, and so on) or sometimes in the sciences. In the course of history, these have usually (but not necessarily) been women. The term is derived from the Muses, ancient Greek goddesses of inspiration.

Human muses are woven throughout history. In modern times, specific people are called muses; as a rule, these are close friends, and sometimes lovers or spouses, who inspire or affect the works of an artist due to their disposition, charisma, wisdom, sophistication, eroticism, intimate friendship, or other traits. Sometimes muses directly provide models for specific paintings and sculptures and for characters in literary works, but sometimes not, rather providing inspiration for the artist's work as a whole.

Muses are distinct from persons who may organize, teach, befriend, marry, or support artists without providing inspiration for their works.

Modern muses who have left a noticeable mark on the history of culture include Varvara Bakhmeteva (for Mikhail Lermontov),  Gala (for Salvador Dalí), Dora Maar (for Picasso), Aline Bernstein (for Thomas Wolfe), Yoko Ono (for John Lennon), Pattie Boyd (for Eric Clapton and George Harrison), Uma Thurman (for Quentin Tarantino), and many others. Muses are sometimes artists in their own right (as with Ono and Maar for instance).

References

Further reading